The Cwmystwyth Grits Group is a Silurian lithostratigraphic group (a sequence of rock strata) in mid Wales. The name is derived from the village of Cwmystwyth near Devil's Bridge in Ceredigion. The Group comprises the Blaen Myherin Mudstones Formation, the Glanyrafon Formation (upper and lower tongues), the Caerau Mudstones Formation, the Rhuddnant Grits Formation (including the Llyn Teifi Member) and the Pysgotwr Grits Formation.

Outcrops
The rocks are intermittently exposed in mid Wales between Cwmystwyth, Llanidloes and Claerwen reservoir.

Lithology and stratigraphy
The Group comprises hundreds of metres thickness of sandstones with subordinate mudstone turbidites laid down in the marine Welsh Basin during the Llandovery epoch.

References

Silurian System of Europe
Geology of Wales